The 1989 College Football All-America team is composed of college football players who were selected as All-Americans by various organizations and writers that chose College Football All-America Teams in 1989. The National Collegiate Athletic Association (NCAA) recognizes five selectors as "official" for the 1989 season. They are: (1) the American Football Coaches Association (AFCA); (2) the Associated Press (AP) selected based on the votes of sports writers at AP newspapers; (3) the Football Writers Association of America (FWAA); (4) the United Press International (UPI) selected based on the votes of sports writers at UPI newspapers; and (5) the Walter Camp Football Foundation (WC).  Other notable selectors included Football News, the Gannett News Service, Newspaper Enterprise Association in conjunction with World Almanac, Scripps Howard (SH), and The Sporting News (TSN).

Consensus All-Americans
The following charts identify the NCAA-recognized consensus All-Americans for the year 1989 and display which first-team designations they received.

Offense

Defense

Special teams

Full selections - offense

Quarterbacks 

 Andre Ware, Houston (CFHOF) (AP-1, FWAA, UPI-1, WCFF, GNS, NEA-2, SH)
 Major Harris, West Virginia (CFHOF) (AFCA, AP-2, GNS, NEA-1)
 Tony Rice, Notre Dame (FN, GNS)
 Darian Hagan, Colorado (AP-3, UPI-2, TSN)
 John Friesz, Idaho (GNS)
 Dee Dowis, Air Force (GNS)
 Ty Detmer, BYU (CFHOF) (GNS)

Running backs 

 Anthony Thompson, Indiana (CFHOF) (AFCA, AP-1, FWAA, UPI-1, WCFF, FN, GNS, NEA-1, SH, TSN)
 Emmitt Smith, Florida (CFHOF) (AFCA, AP-1, FWAA, UPI-1, WCFF, FN, GNS, NEA-2, SH, TSN)
 Blair Thomas, Penn State (AP-2, UPI-2, WCFF, FN, GNS, NEA-1)
 Johnny Bailey (American football), Texas A & I (FWAA, GNS)
 Chuck Weatherspoon, Houston (TSN)
 James Gray, Texas Tech (AP-2, UPI-2)
 Siran Stacy, Alabama (GNS, NEA-2)
 Blaise Bryant, Iowa State (AP-3, GNS)
 Mike Pringle, Cal State, Fullerton (AP-3, GNS)
 Harold Green, South Carolina (GNS)
 Aaron Craver, Fresno State (GNS)
 Ivory Lee Brown, Arkansas-Pine Bluff (GNS)
 Darrell Thompson, Minnesota (GNS)

Wide receivers 

 Clarkston Hines, Duke (CFHOF) (AFCA, AP-1, FWAA, UPI-1, WCFF, FN, GNS, NEA-1, SH)
 Terance Mathis, New Mexico (AFCA, AP-1, FWAA, UPI-1, GNS, SH, TSN)
 Manny Hazard, Houston (AP-1, UPI-2, GNS, NEA-2)
 Rob Moore, Syracuse (AP-2, GNS, TSN)
 Dan Bitson, Tulsa (AP-2, GNS)
 Wesley Carroll, Miami (Fla) (AP-2)
 Reggie Rembert, West Virginia (AP-3, GNS)
 Richard Buchanan, Northwestern (AP-3, GNS)
 Andre Riley, Washington (GNS)
 Shannon Sharpe, Savannah State (GNS)
 Greg McMurtry, Michigan (NEA-2)

Tight ends 

 Mike Busch, Iowa State (AFCA, UPI-1, WCFF, SH)
 Chris Smith, BYU (AP-3 [receiver], TSN)
 Charles Arbuckle, UCLA (UPI-2)
 Mike Jones, Texas A&M (NEA-1)
 Eric Green, Liberty (GNS)
 Derek Brown, Notre Dame (GNS)
 Jackie Harris, Louisiana-Monroe (GNS)
 Derrick Walker, Michigan (NEA-2)

Offensive tackles 

 Jim Mabry, Arkansas (AFCA [offensive line], AP-1, UPI-1 [line], WCFF, FN, SH)
 Mohammed Elewonibi, BYU (AP-3, FWAA [offensive line], UPI-1 [line], GNS [off. guard], NEA-1 [off. guard])
 Bob Kula, Michigan State (AP-1, AFCA [line], UPI-2)
 Doug Glaser, Nebraska (AP-2, UPI-2 [line], WCFF, GNS, NEA-2)
 Stacy Long, Clemson (AP-3, TSN)
 Charles Odiorne, Texas Tech (AP-3, TSN)
 Chris Port, Duke (AP-2, FWAA [line], UPI-2 [line])
 Mike Pfiefer, Kentucky (FN, NEA-1)
 Ed Cunningham, Texas (NEA-1)
 Richmond Webb, Texas A&M (GNS)
 Roman Matusz, Pittsburgh (GNS)
 Glenn Parker, Arizona (GNS)
 Greg Skrepenak, Michigan (NEA-2)

Offensive guards 

 Eric Still, Tennessee (AFCA [line], AP-1, FWAA [line], UPI-1 [line], WCFF, GNS, NEA-2, SH [off. tackle], TSN)
 Joe Garten, Colorado (AFCA [line], AP-1, UPI-1 [line], FWAA [line], NEA-1, SH, TSN)
 Ed King, Auburn (AP-2, UPI-2 [line], WCFF, FN, GNS, SH)
 Mark Tucker, USC (FN, GNS)
 Roy Brown, Virginia (AP-2)
 Dean Dingman, Michigan (AP-3)
 Dave Szott, Penn State (GNS)
 Tim Grunhard, Notre Dame (NEA-2)

Centers 

 Jake Young, Nebraska (AFCA, AP-3, UPI-1 [line], WCFF, NEA-2, SH)
 Michael Tanks, Florida State (AP-1, FWAA [offensive line], UPI-2 [line])
 Bern Brostek, Washington (AP-2, GNS, NEA-1, TSN)
 Frank Cornish, UCLA (FN)
 John Flannery, Syracuse (GNS)
 Tony Mayberry, Wake Forest (GNS)
 Dean Caliguire, Pittsburgh (GNS)

Full selections - defense

Defensive ends 

 Greg Mark, Miami (Fla) (AFCA [defensive line], AP-1 [defensive line], UPI-1 [line], GNS, NEA-2 [line], SH [line], TSN)
 Craig Veasey, Houston (TSN)
 Ray Savage, Virginia (AFCA [defensive line])
 Arthur Walker, Colorado (AP-3 [defensive line])
 Oliver Barnett, Kentucky (AP-3 [defensive line], GNS)

Defensive tackles 

 Chris Zorich, Notre Dame (CFHOF) (AP-1 [defensive line], FWAA [defensive line], UPI-1 [line], WCFF [line], FN, GNS [nose tackle], NEA-2 [line], SH [line], TSN [nose tackle])
 Tim Ryan, USC (AP-1 [defensive line], FWAA [defensive line], UPI-1 [line], WCFF [line], FN, NEA-2 [line], SH [line])
 Marc Spindler, Pittsburgh (AP-2 [defensive line], UPI-2 [line], GNS, TSN)
 Cortez Kennedy, Miami (Fla.) (AP-2 [defensive line], UPI-2 [line], GNS, NEA-1 [line], TSN)
 Jeff Alm, Notre Dame (AP-2, GNS)
 Ray Agnew, North Carolina State (AP-3 [defensive line])
 Russell Maryland, Miami (Fla) (AP-3 [defensive line], GNS)
 Eric Hayes, Florida State (GNS)
 Travis Davis, Michigan State (GNS)
 Ted Washington, Louisville (GNS)

Nose guards 

 Moe Gardner, Illinois (AFCA [defensive line], AP-1 [defensive line], FWAA [defensive line], UPI-1 [line], WCFF [line], FN, GNS [nose tackle], NEA-1 [line], SH [line])
 Odell Haggins, Florida State (AFCA [defensive line], AP-2 [defensive line], UPI-2 [line], WCFF [line], GNS [nose tackle], NEA-1 [line])

Linebackers 

 Alfred Williams, Colorado (AFCA [defensive line], AP-2, FWAA, UPI-1, FN, GNS, NEA-1)
 Percy Snow, Michigan State (AFCA, AP-1, FWAA, UPI-1, WCFF, FN, GNS, NEA-1, SH, TSN [inside linebacker])
 Keith McCants, Alabama (AFCA, AP-1, FWAA, UPI-1, WCFF, FN, GNS, NEA-1, SH, TSN [inside linebacker])
 James Francis, Baylor (AFCA, AP-1, UPI-2, FN, GNS, NEA-1, TSN [special teams])
 Kanavis McGhee, Colorado (UPI-2, WCFF, NEA-2, SH)
 Andre Collins, Penn State (AP-2, FWAA, UPI-2, GNS, NEA-2)
 Junior Seau, USC (AP-2, GNS, NEA-2, TSN [outside linebacker])
 Craig Ogletree, Auburn (TSN [outside linebacker])
 Ned Bolcar, Notre Dame (UPI-2)
 Ron Cox, Fresno State (AP-3, GNS)
 Bob Davis, BYU (AP-3)
 Terry Wooden, Syracuse (AP-3, NEA-2)
 Tony Bennett, Ole Miss (GNS)
 Darion Conner, Jackson State (GNS)

Defensive backs 

 Todd Lyght, Notre Dame (AFCA, AP-1, FWAA, UPI-1, WCFF, FN, GNS [cornerback], NEA-1, SH, TSN)
 Mark Carrier, USC (AFCA, AP-1, FWAA, UPI-1, WCFF, FN, GNS [safety], NEA-1, SH, TSN)
 Tripp Welborne, Michigan (AFCA, AP-1, FWAA, UPI-1, WCFF, FN, GNS [safety], NEA-1, SH, TSN)
 LeRoy Butler, Florida State (AP-1, UPI-1, WCFF, NEA-2, SH)
 Chris Oldham, Oregon (AP-2, FWAA, UPI-2, GNS [cornerback])
 Harlon Barnett, Michigan State (TSN, AP-3)
 John Mangum, Alabama (AP-2, FN)
 Reggie Cooper, Nebraska (AP-2, NEA-1)
 Ben Smith, Georgia (AP-2, UPI-2, NEA-2)
 Walter Briggs, Hawaii (UPI-2)
 Richard Fain, Florida (UPI-2)
 Ken Swilling, Georgia Tech (AP-3, GNS [safety], NEA-2)
 James Williams, Fresno State (AP-3, GNS [cornerback])
 Adrian Jones, Missouri (AP-3)
 Mickey Washington, Texas A&M (GNS [cornerback])
 Alonzo Hampton, Pittsburgh (GNS [cornerback])
 Pat Terrell, Notre Dame (GNS [safety])
 Jesse Campbell, North Carolina State (GNS [safety])
 Nathan LaDuke, Arizona State (NEA-2)

Full selections - special teams

Placekickers 

 Jason Hanson, Washington State (AFCA, AP-1, FWAA, UPI-1, WCFF, FN, GNS, NEA-1, SH, TSN)
 Philip Doyle, Alabama (AP-2, UPI-2, NEA-2)
 Chris Gardocki, Clemson (AP-3, GNS [combination])
 David Browndyke, LSU (GNS)

Punters 

 Tom Rouen, Colorado (AP-1, FWAA, UPI-1, WCFF, GNS, NEA-1, SH)
 Robbie Keen, California (AFCA, UPI-2)
 Kirk Maggio, UCLA (AP-3, NEA-2, TSN)
 Shawn McCarthy, Purdue (AP-2, FN)
 Sean Fleming, Wyoming (GNS)

Return specialists 

 Raghib Ismail, Notre Dame (AP-1, FWAA [kick returner], UPI-2 [wide receiver], FN, GNS [wide receiver], NEA-1 [wide receiver], TSN)
 Mike Bellamy, Illinois (AP-2)
 Ron Gray, Air Force (AP-3)

Key 

 Bold – Consensus All-American
 CFHOF - Inducted into the College Football Hall of Fame
 -1 – First-team selection
 -2 – Second-team selection
 -3 – Third-team selection

Official selectors
 AFCA – selected by American Football Coaches Association, also known as the "Kodak All-America Team"
 AP – Associated Press
 FWAA – Football Writers Association of America
 UPI – United Press International
 WCFF – Walter Camp Football Foundation

Other selectors
 FN – Football News
 GNS - Gannett News Service
 NEA – Newspaper Enterprise Association in conjunction with World Almanac
 SH – Scripps Howard
 TSN – The Sporting News

See also
 1989 All-Big Eight Conference football team
 1989 All-Big Ten Conference football team
 1989 All-Pacific-10 Conference football team
 1989 All-SEC football team

References 

All-America Team
College Football All-America Teams